MS 570 may refer to:

Mississippi Highway 570
Morane-Saulnier MS.570, an aircraft produced in the 1940s